Xinyu University (XYU) is a public university for undergraduate education located at Xinyu, Jiangxi, China.

References

External links
Official Website for Xinyu University (Chinese)

1985 establishments in China
Educational institutions established in 1985
Universities and colleges in Jiangxi
Xinyu